Harpalus bellieri is a species of ground beetle in the subfamily Harpalinae. It was described by Reiche in 1861.

References

bellieri
Beetles described in 1861